Sangue e Areia is a Brazilian telenovela produced and broadcast by TV Globo. It premiered on 18 December 1967 and ended on 25 June 1968. It's the fifth "novela das oito" to be aired on the timeslot.

Plot 
Juan Gallardo, son of a bullfighter died who in enclosure for bullfighting, decides to follow the steps of his father. With the opposition of his family he goes against it and begins bullfighting and ends up abandoning them altogether. He is later faced with a love triangle with two women: Pillar, a simple young woman who always loved him, and Doña Sol, an aristocrat who is educated and cultured.

Cast 

Sangue e Areia is the last telenovela by actor Amilton Fernandes, who portrayed the villain Dom Ricardo Fernandes died in a tragic road accident on 8 April 1968.

References

External links 

TV Globo telenovelas
1967 telenovelas
1967 Brazilian television series debuts
1968 Brazilian television series endings
Brazilian telenovelas
Portuguese-language telenovelas